Ulrich "Uli" Biesinger (6 August 1933 – 18 June 2011) was a German footballer who played at both professional and international levels as a forward.

Career

Born in Augsburg-Oberhausen, Biesinger was an attacker for BC Augsburg. Between 1954 and 1958, he played in seven matches for the Germany national team and scored two goals. He was the youngest player of the German team for the 1954 FIFA World Cup.

Biesinger played the position of center forward. He scored 105 goals in 187 games in the Oberliga Süd between his debut in 1952 and 1959, when BC Augsburg were relegated.

References

1933 births
2011 deaths
German footballers
Germany international footballers
Germany B international footballers
1954 FIFA World Cup players
FIFA World Cup-winning players
SSV Reutlingen 05 players
Sportspeople from Augsburg
Association football forwards
Footballers from Bavaria
TSV Schwaben Augsburg players